Elections of the Dutch Senate were held on 26 May 2003, following the provincial elections on 11 March 2003. The 564 members of the twelve States-Provincial elected the 75 Senate members. The new Senate was installed on 10 June 2003. The term of office ended on 11 June 2007.

Notes

2003
Senate